Clackamas County  is one of the 36 counties in the U.S. state of Oregon. As of the 2020 census, the population was 421,401, making it Oregon's third-most populous county. Its county seat is Oregon City. The county was named after the Native Americans living in the area, the Clackamas people, who are part of the Chinookan peoples.

Clackamas County is part of the Portland-Vancouver-Hillsboro, OR-WA Metropolitan Statistical Area. It is in the Willamette Valley.

History
Originally named Clackamas District, it was one of the four original Oregon districts created by Oregon's Provisional Legislature on July 5, 1843, along with Twality (later Washington), Champooick (later Marion), and Yamhill. The four districts were redesignated as counties in 1845. At the time of its creation, Clackamas County covered portions of four present-day U.S. states and a Canadian province. The Columbia River became the northern boundary of the county in 1844. Soon after, John McLoughlin staked a land claim in Oregon City and built a house that in 2003 became a unit of the Fort Vancouver National Historic Site.

Most of the indigenous people of the Wil-lamet Valley were forcibly removed in February 1859, to the reservation of the Confederated Tribes of Grand Ronde. Most were moved without treaty or compensation for lost lands or resources. Some 22 tribes were moved during the cold winter.  It is estimated that 30% did not survive the first year. The tribes eventually prospered, but outside of Clackamas County. They also never received any revenue or compensation from the logging of their homeland forests.

In addition, the Tribes of the Cascades Mountains were isolated to a Reservation after the signing of a treaty in 1859. Confederated Tribes of Warmsprings was established and remains a strong and vital player in actions that concern the Federal forests of the Cascades Range.

Oregon City was also the site of the only federal court west of the Rockies in 1849, when San Francisco, California, was platted. The plat was filed in 1850 in the first plat book of the first office of records in the West Coast and is still in Oregon City.

In 1902, the Willamette Meteorite was recovered from a field near present-day West Linn.

Geography

Major highways

  Interstate 5
  Interstate 205
  U.S. Route 26
  Oregon Route 35
  Oregon Route 99E
  Oregon Route 212
  Oregon Route 213
  Oregon Route 224

Adjacent counties

 Multnomah County - north
 Hood River County - northeast
 Wasco County - east
 Marion County - south
 Yamhill County - west
 Washington County - northwest

The county includes parts of two national forests: Mount Hood National Forest and Willamette National Forest.

Demographics

2000 census
As of the 2000 census there were 338,391 people, 128,201 households, and 91,663 families in the county.  The population density was 181/sqmi (70/km2). There were 136,954 housing units at an average density of 73/sqmi (28/km2). The racial makeup of the county was 91.27% White, 2.45% Asian, 0.71% Native American, 0.66% Black or African American, 0.17% Pacific Islander, 2.28% from other races, and 2.46% from two or more races. 4.95% of the population were Hispanic or Latino of any race. 20.7% were of German, 11.6% English, 9.1% Irish and 7.5% American ancestry.

There were 128,201 households, out of which 34.20% had children under the age of 18 living with them, 58.60% were married couples living together, 9.00% had a female householder with no husband present, and 28.50% were non-families. 22.00% of all households were made up of individuals, and 7.80% had someone living alone who was 65 years of age or older. The average household size was 2.62 and the average family size was 3.07.

The county population contained 26.20% under the age of 18, 8.00% from 18 to 24, 28.70% from 25 to 44, 26.00% from 45 to 64, and 11.10% who were 65 years of age or older. The median age was 38 years. For every 100 females, there were 97.50 males. For every 100 females age 18 and over, there were 94.90 males.

The median income for a household in the county was $52,080, and the median income for a family was $60,791. Males had a median income of $43,462 versus $30,891 for females. The per capita income for the county was $25,973. About 4.60% of families and 6.60% of the population were below the poverty line, including 7.60% of those under age 18 and 5.10% of those age 65 or over.

2010 census
As of the 2010 census, there were 375,992 people, 145,790 households, and 100,866 families in the county. The racial makeup of the county was 88.2% white, 3.7% Asian, 0.8% American Indian, 0.8% black or African American, 0.2% Pacific islander, 3.1% from other races, and 3.2% from two or more races. Those of Hispanic or Latino origin made up 7.7% of the population. In terms of ancestry, 24.9% were German, 14.5% were English, 13.3% were Irish, 5.0% were Norwegian, and 4.9% were American.

Of the 145,790 households, 32.8% had children under the age of 18 living with them, 54.8% were married couples living together, 9.8% had a female householder with no husband present, 30.8% were non-families, and 24.1% of all households were made up of individuals. The average household size was 2.56 and the average family size was 3.04. The median age was 40.6 years.

The median income for a household in the county was $62,007 and the median income for a family was $74,905. Males had a median income of $53,488 versus $39,796 for females. The per capita income for the county was $31,785. About 6.1% of families and 9.0% of the population were below the poverty line, including 11.2% of those under age 18 and 6.2% of those age 65 or over.

Communities

Several of the county's cities extend into other counties. Lake Oswego and Milwaukie include areas in Multnomah County. Lake Oswego, Rivergrove and Wilsonville include areas in Washington County. The cities of Portland and Tualatin extend into Clackamas County from Multnomah and Washington counties respectively.

In Clackamas County, hamlets and villages are models of local land use governance for unincorporated areas. The four hamlets in Clackamas County are Beavercreek, Molalla Prairie, Mulino, and Stafford. The county's only village is the Villages at Mount Hood.

Cities

 Barlow
 Canby
 Estacada
 Gladstone
 Happy Valley
 Johnson City
 Lake Oswego
 Milwaukie
 Molalla
 Oregon City (county seat)
 Portland
 Rivergrove
 Sandy
 Tualatin
 West Linn
 Wilsonville

Census-designated places

 Beavercreek
 Boring
 Damascus
 Government Camp
 Jennings Lodge
 Mount Hood Village
 Mulino
 Oak Grove
 Oatfield
 Rhododendron
 Stafford
 Sunnyside (former)

Hamlet
 Molalla Prairie

Unincorporated communities

 Barton
 Brightwood
 Bull Run
 Carus
 Carver
 Cazadero
 Cherryville
 Clackamas
 Clarkes
 Colton
 Cottrell
 Eagle Creek
 Faubion
 Jean
 Kelso
 Ladd Hill
 Lakewood
 Liberal
 Logan
 Lone Elder
 Macksburg
 Marmot
 Marquam
 Marylhurst
 Milwaukie Heights
 Mountain Air Park
 Needy
 New Era
 Redland
 Ripplebrook
 Riverside
 Shadowood
 Springwater
 Wankers Corner
 Welches
 Wemme
 Wildwood
 Yoder
 Zigzag

Former unincorporated communities
 Bissell – named for W. S. Bissell, U.S. Postmaster General from 1893 to 1895. Bissell had its own post office from at least 1899 to 1923.

Government and politics

Incorporated communities 
Clackamas County is the first county in Oregon to have four models of governance for its communities. Like the rest of Oregon, it has cities (which are formally incorporated) and rural communities (some of which for federal purposes are considered census-designated places).

After the completion of a process that began in late 1999, the county adopted an ordinance on August 11, 2005, which defined hamlets and villages. By the November 30, 2005, deadline, three communities had submitted petitions to be designated as such. Boring petitioned to become a village, but the application was rejected in a town hall referendum in August 2006. The communities along U.S. Route 26 near Mount Hood from Brightwood to Rhododendron petitioned to become "The Villages at Mount Hood", and it was approved by residents in May 2006. Beavercreek petitioned to become a hamlet, and was recognized as such in September 2006.

While the other counties in the Portland Metropolitan Area are solidly Democratic, Clackamas County typically serves as a swing county. It has usually voted for the eventual winner of presidential elections, with exceptions in 1884, 1892, 1916, 1948, 1960, 1976, and 2016.

State Representatives

State Senators

Economy
Since the county's creation, agriculture, timber, manufacturing, and commerce have been the principal economic activities. Mount Hood, the only year-round ski resort in the United States and the site of Timberline Lodge, is a major attraction for recreation and tourism, offering outdoor recreation activities from skiing and rafting to fishing and camping.

Infrastructure
The county supports the Library Information Network of Clackamas County. The urban areas of the county are also served by Metro.

Notable people

 Bob Amsberry (1928–1957), original member of The Mickey Mouse Club
 Rebecca Anderson (born 1991), beauty pageant titleholder
 Debby Applegate (born 1968), biographer and historian
Jay Baller (born 1960), baseball player
Howard C. Belton (1893–1988), Oregon State Treasurer
William H. Boring (1841–1932), Union soldier; founder of Boring
Nan Britton (1896–1991), secretary and mistress of President Warren G. Harding
George Bruns (1914–1984), Walt Disney Pictures film composer
Ed Coleman (1901–1964), baseball player
Ralph Coleman (1895–1990), baseball coach
 Ryan Crouser (born 1992), shot putter, discus thrower, Olympic Gold Medalist
 Carson Ellis (born 1975), artist and illustrator
 Philip Foster (1805–1884), pioneer
 Alma Francis (1890–1968), stage actress and singer
Tom Gorman (born 1957), baseball pitcher
 Tonya Harding (born 1970), Olympic figure skater
Joni Harms (born 1959), musician
Bill Johnson (1960–2016), Olympic skier
Edwin Markham (1852–1940), Poet Laureate of Oregon
 Colin Meloy (born 1974), musician
 Charis Michelsen (born 1974), actress, model, and makeup artist
Bill Morgan (1910–1985), football player
 Ben Musa (1905–1974), Oregon state legislator
Alan Olsen (born 1948), Oregon State Senator
 Ralph Patt (1929–2010), the jazz-guitarist who invented major-thirds tuning, and also a geological expert on groundwater contamination from the Hanford Site.
Burt Rutan (born 1943), aerospace engineer
Kurt Schrader (born 1951), U.S. Representative from Oregon
Martha Schrader (born 1953), Oregon State Senator
 Chael Sonnen (born 1977), wrestler
Brenda Strong (born 1960), film and television actress
 Maria Thayer (born 1975), actress and comedian
Mark Thorson (born 1983), football player
Aaron E. Waite (1813–1898), Oregon Supreme Court justice
Brian Wilbur (born 1986), Granada Lions quarterback

See also
National Register of Historic Places listings in Clackamas County, Oregon

References

Further reading
 H.O. Lang (ed.), History of the Willamette Valley: Being a Description of the Valley and its Resources, with an Account of its Discovery and Settlement by White Men, and its Subsequent History; Together with Personal Reminiscences of its Early Pioneers. Portland: Himes and Lang, 1885.
 Portrait and Biographical Record of the Willamette Valley, Oregon, Containing Original Sketches of Many Well Known Citizens of the Past and Present. Chicago: Chapman Publishing Co., 1903.

External links
 Clackamas County, Oregon
 Clackamas County hamlets and villages
 Clackamas County Considering Hamlets and Villages, a September 2005 article from Oregon Public Broadcasting

 
1843 establishments in Oregon Country
Populated places established in 1843
Oregon placenames of Native American origin
Portland metropolitan area counties